Nard may refer to:

 'Nard, a 1981 album by American funk and jazz keyboardist Bernard Wright
 Nard (game) (نرد), the Persian board game similar to backgammon
 Nard (plant), of the species Nardostachys jatamansi
 Spikenard, an essential oil derived from the plant.
 The Nard, a nickname for the city of Oxnard, California in the United States
 NARD, The Nigerian Association of Resident Doctors
 National Association of Rudimental Drummers
 nards, slang for testicles

Given name

 Nard Jones, an American novelist
 Nard Ndoka, a politician and minister of health of Albania